Peter John O'Mara (born 9 December 1957) is an Australian-born jazz guitarist, composer, teacher and author. He has been based in Germany since late 1981.

Biography

O'Mara is a self-taught musician and began his professional career in Sydney in 1976. He had private lessons with George Golla at the Academy of Guitar in Sydney as well as attending a number of jazz clinics presented by Jamey Aebersold including musicians like Dave Liebman, Randy Brecker, John Scofield and Hal Galper. He was a  regular at jam sessions where he met musicians like Steve Murphy, Tommy Emmanuel, Michael Bartolomei, Willy Qua, Dale Barlow, Miroslav Bukowsky and Jackie Orszaczky. Steve Murphy and Jackie Orszaczky in particular gave Peter a lot of support, giving him free lessons, musical guidance and gigs. Jackie even produced Peter's first recording "Peter O'Mara" which was eventually released on the independent label Batt Jazz in 1980, receiving widespread critical acclaim. After submitting this recording for a grant application he was awarded the prestigious "Don Banks Memorial Fellowship" for overseas study. At 21 Peter found himself performing regularly with seasoned jazz musicians like Errol Buddle, Barry Duggan and Stewie Speer as well as the big band at South Juniors Football Club backing artists like Patti Page and Al Martino. Peter spent three months in New York in summer 1981 going to concerts, jam sessions as well as having lessons from musicians like Dave Liebman, John Scofield, Jimmy Raney and Attila Zoller. Attila was so excited about Peter's musicality that he recommended him for a position teaching jazz guitar at the University of Memphis, Tennessee. Visa complications prevented him from taking up this opportunity.

He was a prizewinner for Jazz Composition 1980 & 1982, awarded by the NSW Jazz Action Society.

O'Mara moved to Munich, Germany in late 1981 and quickly established himself as one of the most versatile guitarists and composers in Europe. In 1982 he invited Australian saxophonist Dale Barlow to join him for a four-week tour of Germany and Austria. Peter had been able to secure Wayne Darling on bass and Bill Elgart on drums. The success of this project lead to the creation of a trio "Sundial" which performed regularly until 1990, also including tours with Kenny Wheeler as special guest. In 1985 Peter was invited by jazz bassist Detlev Beier to join the faculty of the Kontaktstudium at the Hochschule für Musik und Theater Hamburg as well as jazz workshops in Ibbenbüren and Bielfeld. It was here that he met trumpeter Uli Beckerhoff who soon involved Peter in various projects including the International Skoda All Star Band as well as an annual workshop in Trier, featuring musicians like Norma Winstone, Maria Joao, John Taylor, John Marshall, Matthias Nadolny and Bruno Castellucci. Another important contact was Austrian bassist Adelhard Roidinger with whom Peter performed in a variety of settings from duo to quintet. In late 1989 Adelhard asked Peter to join the faculty at the Bruckner University in Linz, Austria. In 1992 another teaching position presented itself, this time at the Richard Strauss Conservatorium in Munich, later becoming part of the Hochschule Für Musik und Theater. Peter holds tenured professorships at both of these institutions. In 1990 a chance meeting with saxophonist and composer Klaus Doldinger lead to him being invited to join the legendary Jazz-Rock group Passport where he performed for over 23 years, touring Europe a number of times as well as South Africa, Brazil, Morocco and New Zealand. As of late 2019 he is again performing occasionally with them. Another opportunity came in 1999 when he was asked to join the legendary Jazz-Rock group "United Jazz and Rock Ensemble" where he also contributed two compositions to the group's cd "X".

His teaching activities include, among many workshops throughout Europe, a professorship for Jazz guitar at the Anton Bruckner Private University for Music, Drama, and Dance Austria, as well as the University of Music and Performing Arts Munich. He is also author of four highly acclaimed books published by internationally renowned Jazz publishers Advance Music/Schott.

In 2012 Peter issued a jazz album, My Time on his label Marangani Records. Here's what critic Brent Black had to say about it:
A few days ago guitarist Peter O'Mara contacted my office to inquire about the possibility of reviewing his stellar new release My Time and in doing so offers up one of the very finest releases for 2012. This Australian six string wonder has been living in Munich since 1982. Having numerous friends living in Munich and Cologne Germany, I am well aware of the vibrant jazz scene which may rank a close second to New York when considering the depth and virtuoso skill the area artists are able to bring to the studio or concert hall. The artistic community in Germany is however slightly more artist friendly but that is a topic for another time.
Six of the ten tracks are O'Mara originals with some slightly eclectic standards tossed into the mix to keep things fresh and moving. The lyrical sense of purpose is perfectly captured with the opening tune "It Never Entered My Mind." The Rodgers and Hart classic is slightly reharmed into a free flowing ballad with Tim Collins solo adding a harmonic flavor that is rich in texture and color while blending perfectly with this stellar 4tet. The subtle nuances from the rhythm section rounded out by contrabass player Henning Sieverts and Matthias Gmelin are done with the type of finesse and elegance necessary to keep the integrity of this beautiful tune. "Round Midnight" can be a musical trip wire for some artists if they are unable to channel the raw emotion or connectivity necessary to tug at the heartstrings of a listener. O'Mara nails this tune as though he has played it from day one of his career. Clean single note lines with the lyrical bass of Sieverts and deceptively subtle brush work of Gmelin make this tune far more than the average cover but rather an emotional trip back to the future for the jazz aficionado that lives for tradition. O'Mara's riff on Herbie Hancock's "Dolphin Dance" has an intriguing buoyant quality despite being a tune done mid tempo. The ability to shift meter as well as dynamics on the fly is an immediate head turner. O'Mara has the ability to work without a harmonic net and more than ample chops to take this tune back up a notch when necessary. Drummer Gmelin along with the entire rhythm section does not own the pocket here, they are the pocket with a deceptively subtle swing bordering on infectious. One of O'Mara's two best originals are saved for last in "Last Chance" which has the slight musical frame of reference of early Pat Metheny meets John Abercrombie but the key to success is that O'Mara establishes his own voice. Tim Collins drops in with a sonic exploratory of a solo as the ensemble begins pushing the musical envelope with the proficiency of a working band that has been together twenty years. The other original saved to close out this remarkable release is "Movin On" which allows the music if not the release itself to come full circle. While O'Mara is a formidable composer, were it not for a solid working knowledge of the material here one could easily mistake "Movin On" as a standard in waiting and something tells me it could very well be.
I have reviewed over a dozen guitarists thus far with Peter O'Mara rising head and shoulders above the pack. A dynamic 4tet with exquisite song selection and the virtuoso talent to move effortlessly throughout each tune, the aptly titled "My Time" is merely an introduction of a stellar talent whose musical stock should be an arrow pointing straight up. Easily a five star release and one of the best for 2012!

Musicians that O'Mara worked with

He has worked and recorded with many musicians on the international Jazz scene including: Kenny Wheeler, Joe Lovano, Dave Holland, Jon Christensen, Roberto Di Gioia, Adam Nussbaum, Bob Mintzer, Russell Ferrante, Anthony Jackson, Randy Brecker, Terri Lyne Carrington, Pee Wee Ellis, Fred Wesley, Joe Nay, Maria Joao, John Marshall, Patrick Scales, John Taylor, Randy Brecker, Charlie Mariano, Benny Bailey, Robben Ford, Mike Nock, Albert Mangelsdorff, Ack van Rooyen, Johnny Griffin, Willy Qua, Tony Lakatos, Tim Collins.

Books 

 A Rhythmic Concept for Funk/Fusion Guitar (Advance Music)
 A Modal Concept for Jazz Guitar (Advance Music)
 A Chordal Concept for Jazz Guitar (Advance Music) (1996)
 A Rhythmic Concept For Jazz Guitar (Advance Music) (2004)

Discography 

Selected discography
 Peter O'Mara (1980) Battyman (BAT 2074)
 Teletime Unit Records 2015
 Acentric featuring Michael Hornek, Patrick Scales & Christian Lettner Marangani 2009
 YuMag featuring Michael Hornek, Patrick Scales & Christian Lettner Marangani 2008
 Mirage featuring Adam Nussbaum Pirouet 2003
 With-Within-Without Acoustic Music 2001
 Back Seat Driver featuring Johannes Enders Enja 1999
 Too Early For This World GLM Edition Collage 1998
 Heritage featuring Guido May & Biboul Darouiche SBF 1997
 A-Strain featuring Adrian Mears, Patrick Scales & Falk Willis SBF 1996
 Symmetry featuring Bob Mintzer, Marc Johnson & Falk Willis GLM Edition Collage 1995
 Travellers featuring Tony Lakatos, Roberto di Gioia, Anthony Jackson, Ernst Stroeer & Wolfgang Haffner SBF 1994
 Stairway featuring Tony Lakatos, Russell Ferrante, Anthony Jackson, Tom Brechtlein & Alex Acuña Enja 1993
 Kuranda featuring Henning Sieverts, Tony Lush & Mike Nock ITM Pacific 1991
 Avenue U featuring Joe Lovano, Roberto Di Gioia, Dave Holland & Adam Nussbaum Enja 1990
 Wheeler O'Mara Darling Elgart Koala Records 1991
 My Time (2012) Marangani Records

References

External links 

 

1957 births
Living people
United Jazz + Rock Ensemble members
Sydney Conservatorium of Music alumni
Australian jazz guitarists
Passport (band) members
Enja Records artists
Pirouet Records artists
Academic staff of Anton Bruckner Private University